Gunga may refer to:

 Ganges river in India
 Gunga, Bhopal, a village in India
 Gunga, a government office in ancient Japan
 Mohiddin Ghulam Gunga, Afghan wrestler